Monika Schleier-Smith is an American experimental physicist studying many-body quantum physics by precisely assembling systems of ultracold atoms. These atomic, molecular, and optical physics (AMO) engineered systems have applications in quantum sensing, coherent control, and quantum computing. Schleier-Smith is an Associate Professor of Physics at Stanford University, a Sloan Research Fellow, and a National Science Foundation CAREER Award recipient. Schleier-Smith also serves on the board of directors for the Hertz Foundation.

Life and career
Schleier-Smith's research career began an opportunity to do nanotechnology research at the MITRE Corporation while she was a student at Thomas Jefferson High School for Science and Technology in Alexandria, Virginia. She went on to attend Harvard University as an undergraduate, receiving a B.A. in Chemistry and Physics and (secondarily) Mathematics in 2005. Afterwards, Schleier-Smith pursued graduate studies with the supervision of Vladan Vuletić at MIT on a National Science Foundation Graduate Research Fellowship. Her Ph.D. thesis introduced a quantum-enhanced atomic clock and was recognized by the Hertz Foundation with a Doctoral Thesis Prize. During her time in Boston, Schleier-Smith also completed the Boston Marathon six times. Subsequently, Schleier-Smith conducted postdoctoral research at LMU Munich and Max Planck Institute of Quantum Optics.

In the fall of 2013, Schleier-Smith joined the Stanford faculty as an Assistant Professor of Physics. The Schleier-Smith Lab exploits precise hybrid light-matter interactions to demonstrate engineered dynamics in cold atom systems. According to Schleier-Smith, "Hybrid systems are likely to harbor surprises that will fuel quantum science for decades to come". An important regime under investigation is the entanglement frontier.

She is a recipient of the 2019 Presidential Early Career Award for Scientists and Engineers.

In 2020, Schleier was awarded a MacArthur Fellowship in recognition of her work.

In 2021, Schleier received the I.I Rabi Prize in Atomic, Molecular and Optical Physics for her work in quantum optics.

In 2021, Schleier was named a Fellow of the American Physical Society.

Recognition and awards 

 Alfred P. Sloan Research Fellowship, Alfred P. Sloan Foundation (2014)
 AFOSR Young Investigator Award, Air Force Office of Scientific Research (2014)
 Hellman Fellowship, Hellman Fellows Fund (2015)
 Cottrell Scholar Award, Research Corporation (2017)
 NSF Career Award, National Science Foundation (2018)
 Presidential Early Career Award for Scientists and Engineers (PECASE), Department of Defense (2019)
MacArthur Fellowship, MacArthur Foundation (2020)
 I.I Rabi Prize in Atomic, Molecular and Optical Physics, American Physical Society (2021)
Fellow of the American Physical Society (2021)

External links

Schleier-Smith Lab, Stanford

References

Living people
21st-century American physicists
American women physicists
Harvard University alumni
Year of birth missing (living people)
MIT Department of Physics alumni
21st-century American women scientists
MacArthur Fellows
Fellows of the American Physical Society
Recipients of the Presidential Early Career Award for Scientists and Engineers
Thomas Jefferson High School for Science and Technology alumni